Meddybemps Lake is a large lake in Washington County, Maine. The lake itself is split between four towns: Alexander, Baileyville, Baring, and Meddybemps. It is well known for its prolific smallmouth bass fishing.

References

External links
Meddybempslake.org

Lakes of Washington County, Maine
Reservoirs in Maine